Alvin Allen "Vin" Eustis (November 3, 1893 – January 17, 1970) was an American football and basketball coach and college athletics administrator. He served as the head football coach at State Normal School at Cheney—now known as Eastern Washington University—from 1920 to 1926, compiling a record of 24–25–1.  Eustis was also the head basketball coach at Cheney Normal from 1919 to 1917, tallying a mark of 106–44, and the school's athletic director from 1920 to 1927. Eustis died on January 17, 1970, at a hospital in Oakland, California, following an illness of four months.

Head coaching record

Football

References

External links
 

1893 births
1970 deaths
Basketball coaches from Wisconsin
Eastern Washington Eagles athletic directors
Eastern Washington Eagles football coaches
Eastern Washington Eagles men's basketball coaches
Pomona-Pitzer Sagehens football players
Washington State Cougars football players
People from Beloit, Wisconsin
Pomona College alumni